Poppitz is a 2002 Austrian comedy film directed by Harald Sicheritz.

Cast 
 Roland Düringer - Gerry Schartl
 Marie Bäumer - Lena Schartl
 Nora Heschl - Patrizia Schartl
 Kai Wiesinger - Ben
 Alfred Dorfer - Bertram Klingelmeier
 Reinhard Nowak - Fritz Nowak
 Oliver Korittke - Uwe Schalk
 Maria Hofstätter - Frau Kübel
  - Grete Nowak

References

External links 

2002 comedy films
2002 films
Austrian comedy films